Air Chief Marshal Sir David Harcourt-Smith,  (born 14 October 1931) is a former Royal Air Force officer who served as Air Officer Commanding-in-Chief at RAF Support Command from 1984 to 1986. He is the author of Wings Over Suez, an account of air operations during the Sinai and Suez wars.

RAF career
Educated at Felsted School and the Royal Air Force College Cranwell, Harcourt-Smith was commissioned into the Royal Air Force in 1952. He flew the DH Venom fighter-bomber in the Suez Crisis and Aden Emergency, where he won the Distinguished Flying Cross for gallantry and devotion to duty in 1957.

Harcourt-Smith was appointed Officer Commanding No. 54 Squadron in 1963 and Officer Commanding No. 6 Squadron in 1969 before moving on to be Station Commander at RAF Bruggen in 1972 and Commandant of the Royal Air Force College Cranwell in 1978. He went on to be Assistant Chief of the Air Staff (Operational Requirements) in 1980, Air Officer Commanding-in-Chief at RAF Support Command in 1984 and Controller of Aircraft in 1986. As Controller of Aircraft he oversaw the introduction of the Tucano training aircraft. He retired in 1989.

Family
In 1957 Harcourt-Smith married Dorothy Mary Entwistle; they had two sons and one daughter.

References

1931 births
Graduates of the Royal Air Force College Cranwell
Knights Commander of the Order of the Bath
Knights Grand Cross of the Order of the British Empire
Living people
People educated at Felsted School
Recipients of the Distinguished Flying Cross (United Kingdom)
Royal Air Force air marshals
Commandants of the Royal Air Force College Cranwell